Marcus Raglan Webb Milner (born 28 November 1991) is a Jamaican footballer who plays for Ware as a midfielder.

Career
Born in Kingston, Surrey, Milner made his debut for Southend United on 8 May 2010 in their 3–1 away defeat to Southampton in League One, replacing Stuart O'Keefe in the 87th minute as a substitute.

During the 2012–13 season Milner made 11 appearances for Isthmian League team Wingate & Finchley and re-signed for the club for the 2013-14 season.

Milner played his last game for Wingate & Finchley on 21 September 2013 in a 3–1 defeat against Lewes before signing for Isthmian League Division One South club Crawley Down Gatwick in January 2014.

References

External links

1991 births
Living people
Sportspeople from Kingston, Jamaica
Jamaican footballers
Association football midfielders
Southend United F.C. players
Maldon & Tiptree F.C. players
Wingate & Finchley F.C. players
Crawley Down Gatwick F.C. players
Ware F.C. players
Brentwood Town F.C. players
English Football League players
Isthmian League players
Black British sportspeople